Oberhavel is a Kreis (district) in the northern part of Brandenburg, Germany. Its neighbouring districts are (clockwise from the north): Mecklenburg-Strelitz in Mecklenburg-Western Pomerania, the districts of Uckermark and Barnim, the Bundesland of Berlin, and the districts of Havelland and Ostprignitz-Ruppin.

Geography
The district is located on the upper course of the Havel river from its source to the outskirts of Berlin. The north is characterised by many lakes including the Großer Stechlinsee, which is well known thanks to a novel by Theodor Fontane called Der Stechlin.

History
The district was created on 6 December 1993 through the merging of the old Gransee and Oranienburg districts.

Coat of arms 
The coat of arms shows the eagle as the symbol of Brandenburg in the upper part. In the lower half are two flying swans on green background representing nature with many lakes. The coat of arms was unofficially used by the precursor district of Oranienburg before the merger, but was never officially granted. It was granted to the district of Oberhavel on 18 May 1994.

Towns and municipalities

Demography

Sport
The district is home to three rugby union clubs, the RU Hohen Neuendorf, Veltener RC and Stahl Hennigsdorf Rugby. The latter was the most successful rugby club in East Germany, winning 27 national championships from 1952 to 1990.

References

External links

 Official website (German)

 
1993 establishments in Germany